Geir Oustorp is a former Norwegian handball player.

He made his debut on the Norwegian national team in 1992, and played 91 matches for the national team between 1992 and 2004. He participated at the 1999 World Men's Handball Championship.

References

Year of birth missing (living people)
Living people
Norwegian male handball players